The son of Tuoba Pugen (born and died 316) ruled as prince of the Tuoba Dai in 316. In 316, Tuoba Pugen defeated and killed his cousin, Tuoba Liuxiu (拓跋六修), to become the next Prince of Dai, succeeding Tuoba Yilu. However, his reign only lasted a few months before he died of illness. His first and only son, whose name was either never recorded or never given at all, was born at the time of his death, so Pugen's mother, Lady Qi, installed him as the new Prince of Dai. However, his son also died by the end of the year. The people of Dai thus chose his cousin, Tuoba Yulü, to succeed him. Likely due to their very short reigns, he and his father never were never posthumously honoured during the Northern Wei period.

References 

 Wei, Shou (554). Book of Wei (Wei Shu).

316 births
316 deaths
Princes of Dai (Sixteen Kingdoms)
Northern Wei people